The William Ziegler House was a mansion at 2 East 63rd Street in New York City. It was designed by Frederick Sterner in 1919 for William Ziegler Jr. and constructed by 1921.

History 
He sold it to David Belasco for a 300-bed actors' hospital in 1926, then to Woolworth's relative Norman Bailey Woolworth in 1929, who then donated it to the New York Academy of Sciences in about 1949. They listed it for sale in 2001, but it didn't sell until 2005 when billionaire Leonard Blavatnik bought it for $31 million, who then said it was an investment for his Access Industries. It was still unoccupied in 2008.

Further reading

References

Upper East Side

Demolished buildings and structures in Manhattan